New Cambria is a city in Macon County, Missouri, United States. The population was 153 at the 2020 census.

History
New Cambria was first named Stockton, and under the latter name laid out in 1861, and named after James Stocks, a railroad man. The present name New Cambria means "New Wales". A post office called New Cambria has been in operation since 1864.

The Gardner and Tinsley Filling Station was listed on the National Register of Historic Places in 2002.

Geography
New Cambria is located at  (39.776588, -92.751314).

Demographics

2010 census
As of the census of 2010, there were 195 people, 84 households, and 49 families living in the city. The racial makeup of the city was 94.4% White, 0.5% Native American, and 5.1% Asian. Hispanic or Latino of any race were 3.1% of the population.

There were 84 households, of which 23.8% had children under the age of 18 living with them, 38.1% were married couples living together, 13.1% had a female householder with no husband present, 7.1% had a male householder with no wife present, and 41.7% were non-families. 34.5% of all households were made up of individuals, and 9.6% had someone living alone who was 65 years of age or older. The average household size was 2.32 and the average family size was 3.00.

The median age in the city was 37.5 years. 21.5% of residents were under the age of 18; 15.9% were between the ages of 18 and 24; 23.6% were from 25 to 44; 26.7% were from 45 to 64; and 12.3% were 65 years of age or older. The gender makeup of the city was 51.3% male and 48.7% female.

2000 census
As of the census of 2000, there were 222 people, 96 households, and 54 families living in the city. The population density was 329.2 people per square mile (127.9/km). There were 127 housing units at an average density of 188.3/sq mi (73.2/km). The racial makeup of the city was 97.30% White, 0.45% African American, 0.90% Native American, and 1.35% from two or more races. Hispanic or Latino of any race were 0.45% of the population.

There were 96 households, out of which 27.1% had children under the age of 18 living with them, 41.7% were married couples living together, 8.3% had a female householder with no husband present, and 43.8% were non-families. 38.5% of all households were made up of individuals, and 22.9% had someone living alone who was 65 years of age or older. The average household size was 2.31 and the average family size was 3.11.

In the city, the population was spread out, with 25.7% under the age of 18, 7.7% from 18 to 24, 23.9% from 25 to 44, 19.8% from 45 to 64, and 23.0% who were 65 years of age or older. The median age was 38 years. For every 100 females there were 101.8 males. For every 100 females age 18 and over, there were 89.7 males.

The median income for a household in the city was $25,536 and the median income for a family was $44,500. Males had a median income of $21,875 versus $19,821 for females. The per capita income for the city was $14,331. None of the families and 6.1% of the population were living below the poverty line, including no under eighteens and 12.0% of those over 64.

References

External links
 Historic maps of New Cambria in the Sanborn Maps of Missouri Collection at the University of Missouri

Cities in Macon County, Missouri
1861 establishments in Missouri
Cities in Missouri